Stephen Derek McBride (born 2 May 1964 in Lurgan, Northern Ireland) is a former Northern Irish footballer.

Managerial career
In August 2008, he succeeded Terry Cochrane as manager of his local and former team, Glenavon. However, with Glenavon languishing at the bottom of the IFA Premiership, McBride and Director of Football at the club, Alan Fraser were sacked on 28 January 2009. In August 2010, the former Glenavon and Linfield striker took over from Tony Bell at Mid Ulster league club Tandragee Rovers. A Club spokesman said of McBrides appointment, "We are delighted to get an A licence coach with his experience and high profile, we look forward to the Rovers going from strength to strength during the coming season."

Representative Honours
 Northern Ireland: 4 Full Caps (1990–1991)
 1 Under-23 Cap / 1 Goal (1990)
 Irish League: 2 Caps (1990).
 Club Honours: (with Glenavon) Irish Cup Runner-Up 1987/88, 1990/91, 1995/96;
 Irish League Cup Winner 1989/90;
 Floodlit Cup Winner 1988/89; Gold Cup Winner 1990/91;
 Co. Antrim Shield Winner 1990/91, 1995/96;
 Mid-Ulster Cup Winner.

Awards
 Ulster Footballer of the Year 1990/91 
NI Football Writers’ Player of the Year 1991.

Northern Ireland Cap Details
 17-10-1990 - Denmark - H D 1-1 ECQ sub
 06-02-1991 - Poland - H W 3-1 FR sub
 11-09-1991 - Faroe Islands - A W 5-0 ECQ sub
 13-11-1991 - Denmark - A L 1-2 ECQ

Summary
 1(3)/0. Won 2, Drew 1, Lost 1.

References

1964 births
Living people
Association footballers from Northern Ireland
Northern Ireland international footballers
Ulster Footballers of the Year
Northern Ireland Football Writers' Association Players of the Year
Linfield F.C. players
Motherwell F.C. players
Glenavon F.C. players
Bangor F.C. players
Crusaders F.C. players
NIFL Premiership players
Glenavon F.C. managers
Association football forwards
Football managers from Northern Ireland